Mostovaya is a rural locality (a village) in Dvurechenskoye Rural Settlement, Permsky District, Perm Krai, Russia. The population was 788 as of 2010.

Geography 
Mostovaya is located on the Mostovaya River, 44 km southeast of Perm (the district's administrative centre) by road.

References 

Rural localities in Permsky District